Donald Kennedy (1931–2020) was an American scientist, public administrator and academic.

Donald Kennedy may also refer to:
Donald Kennedy (Australian politician) (1807–1864), pastoralist, banker and member of the Victorian Legislative Council (Australia)
Donald MacBeth Kennedy (1884–1957), farmer and provincial and federal level Canadian politician
Donald Kennedy (footballer) (1888–1916), Scottish footballer
Donald Mackenzie-Kennedy (1889–1965), British colonial administrator, Governor of Nyasaland and later, Mauritius
Donald Gilbert Kennedy (1898–1976), teacher and British colonial administrator
Don Kennedy (born 1930), American radio and TV personality
Don Kennedy (actor) (1921–2013), American actor